The Österreichische Gesellschaft für Operations Research (OeGOR) (Austrian Society of Operations Research) is the professional non-profit society for the scientific field of Operations Research in Austria. The society is recognized by the International Federation of Operational Research Societies and its subgrouping, the Association of European Operational Research Societies, as the main national society for Operations Research in its country.

History 

OeGOR was created in 1978 with the aim of promoting the development of Operations Research and Mathematical Programming in Austria, both from a methodological point as well as an applied research point of views. The recognition of the role and the professional qualification of the operation researchers and the promotion of relationships between operations researchers, inside and outside Austria are strategic goals of OeGOR.

Since 1978 the society had the following presidents:

 2016-     Raimund Kovacevic
 2012-2016 Marc Reimann
 2006-2012 Marion Rauner  
 2003-2006 Immanuel Bomze 
 1999-2003 Richard Hartl  
 1997-1999 Mikulas Luptacik  
 1993-1997 Ulrike Leopold-Wildburger
 1992-1993 Georg Pflug
 1991-1992 Wolfgang Katzenberger
 1988-1991 Gustav Feichtinger
 1986-1988 Rainer Burkard
 19XX-1986 Peter Harhammer
 1978-19XX Christoph Mandl

Governance 

The OeGOR is governed by a president, who manages the association with the Council, consisting of 8 councilors elected by the assembly of the members, including the President and the Vice-President. On a proposal of the members, OeGOR allows for the creation of Arbeitskreise based on either geographical or methodological and application affinity.

The headquarters of OeGOR are currently located at the Operations Research and Control Systems (ORCOS) group, which is part of the Institute of Statistics and Mathematical Methods in Economics at the Technical University of Vienna.

The current leadership (as of June 29, 2016) consists of Raimund Kovacevic (President, Vienna University of Technology) and Ronald Hochreiter (Vice-President, Vienna University of Economics and Business) along with (in alphabetical order) Klaus Altendorfer (University of Applies Sciences Upper Austria), Doris Behrens (Aneurin Bevan University Health Board), Karl Dörner (University of Vienna), Günther Füllerer (STRABAG AG), Tina Wakolbinger (Vienna University of Economics and Business) and Angelika Wiegele (Alpen-Adria Universität Klagenfurt).

Membership 

Currently (2016) OeGOR has about 250 members - individuals (professors and researches from university and research institutions and professionals) and institutions from academia, industry and administration.

Publications 

OeGOR publishes a scientific journal  CEJOR - Central European Journal of Operations Research, which is published by Springer. The current Editor-in-Chief of CEJOR is the former OeGOR president Ulrike Leopold-Wildburger. Furthermore, the OeGOR News are published once or twice a year containing news about the society.

Awards 

Every year OeGOR awards an award for both the best Masters Thesis as well as the best PhD Thesis in the field of Operations Research in Austria.

References

External links
 

Operations research societies
Research institutes in Austria
Organizations established in 1978
1978 establishments in Australia